Marcin Firlej (born May 4, 1975, in Rejowiec Fabryczny) is a Polish journalist, writer and war correspondent.

Career
As of April 2009, he is a permanent correspondent of the public Polish Television (TVP) in Washington, DC. He previously worked as a war correspondent for TVN24 (2001–2008) and investigative reporter for RMF FM radio (2005–2008). He covered wars in Iraq, Afghanistan and Gaza Strip.

April 8, 2003 Marcin Firlej with Jacek Kaczmarek (Polskie Radio – public Polish Radio) were captured by Republican Guard gunmen near Al-Hillah in Central Iraq. During imprisonment, the two journalists were taken to a school where they were interrogated and accused of spying. They escaped the next day during the American attack on the city.

Works
He is the co-author of a book about the war in Iraq "Szum skrzydel Azraela" ("The Rustle of The Azrael Wings" ) and the director and scriptwriter of two documentary films about Afghanistan (shown in Discovery Historia, 2008).

See also
Television in Poland

References

1975 births
Polish television journalists
Living people